Black Information Network (BIN) is a radio network and content brand owned by iHeartMedia. Launched on June 30, 2020, it is an all-news radio network of stations targeting the African American community, carrying mostly important national news headline stories as well as current events and special interest features. Some stations also incorporate local news, traffic, weather and sports updates into the network feed. Tony Coles is the network's president and Tanita Myers is the news director.

History 
On June 29, 2020, 15 iHeartMedia radio stations in markets with large African American populations (including AM, FM, and HD Radio subchannel stations) ceased their regular programming, and began stunting with clips of speeches by prominent African Americans, such as Malcolm X's "The Ballot or the Bullet" address, interspersed with messages stating that "our side of the story is about to be told", and promoting a major change in their programming at 12:00 p.m. EDT the next day. 

On June 30, 2020 at 12:00 p.m. EDT, iHeartMedia officially launched the Black Information Network (BIN) on the 15 stunting stations, carrying national news coverage catered to African American communities. The service draws from other iHeartMedia services for local traffic and weather updates, and promotes podcasts oriented towards the audience. The network will be carried by additional stations over time, and is also being distributed on the iHeartRadio streaming platform. 

BIN also serves as the provider of news content for iHeartMedia stations carrying formats that predominantly target African-Americans, including hip hop, R&B, and gospel.  Stations not owned by iHeart may also subscribe to the service, with newscasts available at the :00 and :30 mark each hour.

Alongside traditional advertising, BIN is also being backed by a group of "national founding partners", including Bank of America, CVS Health, GEICO, Lowe's, McDonald's, Sony, 23andMe, and Verizon Communications which will air outreach towards African-American communities on the network.  Currently, the number of minutes each hour devoted to commercials is considerably lower than most radio networks. 

On September 10, 2020, iHeartMedia announced that it would acquire WWRL in New York City, a station that had historically carried formats serving the African American community, to carry BIN beginning November 2.  BIN programming was previously available in the New York radio market via 105.1 WWPR-FM's third HD Radio subchannel. On December 2, 2020, iHeartMedia announced that it would acquire Fort Worth's KHVN and its simulcast partner KKGM, with an intent for them to be BIN's stations in the Dallas-Fort Worth market, replacing their existing Black Gospel format.

Stations 

 Asterisk (*) indicates HD Radio broadcast.
 Gray background indicates low-power FM translator.

References

External links

IHeartRadio digital channels
Radio stations established in 2020
African-American radio
2020 establishments in the United States